The Pinnacles are two chalk formations, including a stack and a stump, located near Handfast Point, on the Isle of Purbeck in Dorset, southern England.

Location 
The Pinnacles lie directly east of Studland, approximately 200 metres south of Old Harry Rocks and about 4 kilometres northeast of Swanage. The chalk headlands of the Ballard Downs are owned by the National Trust. The rocks can be viewed from the Dorset section of the South West Coastal Path.

Geography 
The downlands of Ballard Down are formed of chalk with some bands of flint, and were formed approximately 66 million years ago. The bands of stone have been gradually eroded over the centuries, some of the earlier stacks having fallen while new ones have been formed by the breaching of narrow isthmuses. Across the water to the east the Needles on the Isle of Wight are usually visible.  These are also part of the same chalk band and only a few thousand years ago were connected to Ballard Down.

To form the stacks, the sea gradually eroded along the joints and bedding planes where the softer chalk meets harder bedrock of the rock formations to create a cave. This eventually eroded right through to create an arch. The arch subsequently collapsed to leave the stacks called The Pinnacles.

References

Bibliography

External links
 Old Harry Rocks - The end of the story Jurassic Coast homepage. Retrieved 2010-11-16

Isle of Purbeck
Landforms of Dorset
Stacks of England
Geology of Dorset
Tourist attractions in Dorset
Jurassic Coast